Akshat Khamparia (born 9 February 1989) is an Indian chess International Master. He is the first player from Central India to hold an 'International Master' Title.

He has played more than 100 national championships and more than 40 international championships. He holds the 58th rank in the Top 100 Chess Players list of India (published by the World Chess Federation) and is the only player of Madhya Pradesh to win all the State U-8, U-10, U-12,U-14,U-16,U-19, U-25 and Seniors Chess Championship.

Khamparia has represented India in various international championships at Turkey, Malaysia, Bahrain, UAE, Sri Lanka, Iran, Nepal and many other countries. He was a silver medalist in the Commonwealth Chess Championship, and has a master's title from World Chess Federation. He was an International Master in the 82nd FIDE Congress 2011 at Karkow, Poland, in October 2011. IM Akshat Khamparia (IND) won the extraordinarily close GM group of the usual monthly First Saturday GM tournament in May 2018.

Achievements

 Silver Medalist in Commonwealth Chess Championship
 Recipient of Malwa Khel Ratna Award
 1st player from Central India to become International Master
 Rating wise best player in whole Madhya Pradesh since 2003
 Ranked 88th in India 
 National A Player.
 Played in 120+ national championships and 80+ international championships

References

Living people
Indian chess players
1989 births
Chess International Masters